Marcel Huot (Épernay, 9 September 1896 — Pantin, 23 April 1954) was a French professional road bicycle racer, who won one stage in the 1928 Tour de France.

Major results

1923
Tour de France:
10th place overall classification
1928
Tour de France:
Winner stage 19
9th place overall classification

External links 

Official Tour de France results for Marcel Huot

French male cyclists
1896 births
1954 deaths
French Tour de France stage winners
People from Épernay
Sportspeople from Marne (department)
Cyclists from Grand Est